Ski Station is a railway station located in Ski, Norway. It also serves as the terminal station of the Follo Line.

The station is served by all passenger trains on the Østfold Line and Follo Line. This includes regional services to Halden Station and Gothenburg Central Station, as well as Oslo Commuter Rail services to Moss Station and Mysen Station. Ski is also the terminal station for a commuter train service to Oslo that stops at all stations on the Østfold Line.

The restaurant at the station was taken over by Norsk Spisevognselskap on 1 January 1921, but leased to private operators. After an agreement with Norwegian State Railways, Spisevognselskapet renovated the restaurant and took over operations again on 1 January 1924. It was closed on 14 April 1946.

New station

In the mid 1990s, the Østfold Line between Ski to Moss was upgraded to a double-track and  operation. Plans to build a new parallel double track from Ski to Oslo, the Follo Line, were proposed by the Norwegian National Rail Administration. The first stage of this involved building a new station at Ski. The new station includes six platforms. Parts of the new station were opened in August 2020, and the entire station was opened in August 2022.

References

Railway stations in Ski, Norway
Railway stations on the Østfold Line
Railway stations opened in 1879
1879 establishments in Norway